The men's canoe slalom K-1 competition at the 2012 Olympic Games in London took place between 29 July and 1 August at the Lee Valley White Water Centre.

Twenty-two canoeists from 22 countries competed. Daniele Molmenti of Italy won the gold medal.

Competition format
The competition started with heats. Each athlete ran the course twice and the best of these two scores determined the 15 qualifiers for the semi-finals. In the semi-final each canoeist ran the course once. The 10 best scores qualified for the final, which was also one run down the course. The canoeist with the best score won the gold medal.

Schedule 
All times are British Summer Time (UTC+01:00)

Results

References

Men's slalom K-1
Men's events at the 2012 Summer Olympics